The 2019 York9 FC season is the first season in the club's history, as well as first season in Canadian Premier League history.

Squad
As of November 2, 2019.

Transfers

In

Draft picks 
York9 FC selected the following players in the 2018 CPL–U Sports Draft on November 12, 2018. Draft picks are not automatically signed to the team roster. Only those who are signed to a contract will be listed as transfers in.

Loan In

Out

Competitions 
Match times are Eastern Daylight Time (UTC−4).

Preseason

Canadian Premier League

Spring season

Table

Results summary

Results by match

Matches

Fall season

Table

Results summary

Results by match

Matches

Canadian Championship

First qualifying round

Second qualifying round

Third qualifying round

Statistics

Squad and statistics 

|-
! colspan="14" style="background:#dcdcdc; text-align:center"| Goalkeepers
 
 
 
|-
! colspan="14" style="background:#dcdcdc; text-align:center"| Defenders

 

|-
! colspan="14" style="background:#dcdcdc; text-align:center"| Midfielders

 
  

 
|-
! colspan="14" style="background:#dcdcdc; text-align:center"| Forwards
 
 
 
 
 
 
|}

Top scorers 
{| class="wikitable sortable alternance"  style="font-size:85%; text-align:center; line-height:14px; width:85%;"
|-
!width=10|Rank
!width=10|Nat.
! scope="col" style="width:275px;"|Player
!width=10|Pos.
!width=80|CPL Spring season
!width=80|CPL Fall season
!width=80|Canadian Championship
!width=80|TOTAL
|-
|1|||| Rodrigo Gattas        || FW || 2 || 7 || 2 ||11
|-
|2|||| Ryan Telfer        || MF || 1 || 7 || 2 ||10
|-
|3|||| Simon Adjei        || FW || 2 || 5 || 1 ||8
|-
|4|||| Wataru Murofushi  || MF || 0 || 3 || 0 ||3
|-
|rowspan=4|5|||| Manny Aparicio        || MF || 1 || 1 || 0 ||2
|-
||| Joseph Di Chiara  || MF || 0 || 2 || 0 ||2
|-
||| Luca Gasparotto        || DF || 0 || 1 || 1 ||2
|-
||| Kyle Porter        || MF || 0 || 2 || 0 ||2
|-
|rowspan=3|9|||| Diyaeddine Abzi  || DF || 0 || 1 || 0 ||1
|-
||| Morey Doner        || DF || 1 || 0 || 0 ||1
|-
||| Emilio Estevez  || MF || 0 || 1 || 0 ||1
|-
|colspan="4"|Own goals      || 2 || 0 || 0 || 2
|-
|- class="sortbottom"
| colspan="4"|Totals||9||30||6||45

Top assists 
{| class="wikitable sortable alternance"  style="font-size:85%; text-align:center; line-height:14px; width:85%;"
|-
!width=10|Rank
!width=10|Nat.
! scope="col" style="width:275px;"|Player
!width=10|Pos.
!width=80|CPL Spring season
!width=80|CPL Fall season
!width=80|Canadian Championship
!width=80|TOTAL
|-
|1|||| Kyle Porter  || MF || 1 || 3 || 2 ||6
|-
|rowspan=2|2|||| Diyaeddine Abzi        || DF || 0 || 4 || 0 ||4
|-
||| Morey Doner        || DF || 0 || 4 || 0 ||4
|-
|rowspan=4|4|||| Simon Adjei        || FW || 0 || 2 || 0 ||2
|-
||| Manny Aparicio        || MF || 0 || 2 || 0 ||2
|-
||| Steven Furlano        || DF || 0 || 2 || 0 ||2
|-
||| Ryan Telfer        || MF || 0 || 1 || 1 ||2
|-
|rowspan=7|8|||| Joseph Di Chiara  || MF || 0 || 1 || 0 ||1
|-
||| Emilio Estevez  || MF || 1 || 0 || 0 ||1
|-
||| Luca Gasparotto        || DF || 0 || 0 || 1 ||1
|-
||| Rodrigo Gattas        || FW || 0 || 0 || 1 ||1
|-
||| Stefan Lamanna        || MF || 0 || 1 || 0 ||1
|-
||| Austin Ricci        || FW || 1 || 0 || 0 ||1
|-
||| Emmanuel Zambazis        || MF || 0 || 1 || 0 ||1
|-
|- class="sortbottom"
| colspan="4"|Totals||3||21||5||29

Clean sheets 
{| class="wikitable sortable alternance"  style="font-size:85%; text-align:center; line-height:14px; width:85%;"
|-
!width=10|Rank
!width=10|Nat.
! scope="col" style="width:275px;"|Player
!width=80|CPL Spring season
!width=80|CPL Fall season
!width=80|Canadian Championship
!width=80|TOTAL
|-
|1|||| Nathan Ingham  || 3 || 3 || 2 ||8
|-
|- class="sortbottom"
| colspan="3"|Totals||3||3||2||8

Disciplinary record 
{| class="wikitable sortable alternance"  style="font-size:85%; text-align:center; line-height:14px; width:85%;"
|-
!rowspan="2" width=10|No.
!rowspan="2" width=10|Pos.
!rowspan="2" width=10|Nat.
!rowspan="2" scope="col" style="width:275px;"|Player
!colspan="2" width=80|CPL Spring season
!colspan="2" width=80|CPL Fall season
!colspan="2" width=80|Canadian Championship
!colspan="2" width=80|TOTAL
|-
! !!  !!  !!  !!  !!  !!  !! 
|-
|2||DF|||| Daniel Gogarty    ||1||0||1||0||1||0||3||0
|-
|3||DF|||| Morey Doner    ||0||0||3||0||0||0||3||0
|-
|5||DF|||| Justin Springer    ||0||0||2||0||0||0||2||0
|-
|6||DF|||| Roger Thompson    ||0||0||1||0||0||0||1||0
|-
|8||MF|||| Joseph Di Chiara    ||2||0||4||0||2||0||8||0
|-
|10||MF|||| Manny Aparicio    ||2||1||3||0||1||0||6||1
|-
|11||MF|||| Emilio Estevez    ||2||0||0||0||0||0||2||0
|-
|12||FW|||| Simon Adjei    ||0||0||0||0||1||0||1||0
|-
|13||DF|||| Luca Gasparotto    ||1||0||2||0||1||0||4||0
|-
|14||MF|||| Emmanuel Zambazis    ||0||0||1||0||0||0||1||0
|-
|18||MF|||| Ryan Telfer    ||0||0||2||0||1||0||3||0
|-
|19||MF|||| Kyle Porter    ||1||0||0||0||0||0||1||0
|-
|20||DF|||| Diyaeddine Abzi    ||0||0||2||0||0||0||2||0
|-
|22||FW|||| Rodrigo Gattas    ||2||0||0||0||1||0||3||0
|-
|23||MF|||| Wataru Murofushi    ||2||0||1||0||0||0||3||0
|-
|77||DF|||| Steven Furlano    ||1||0||3||0||0||0||4||0
|-
|- class="sortbottom"
| colspan="4"|Totals||14||1||25||0||8||0||47||1

References

External links 
2019 York9 FC season at Official Site

York United FC seasons
York9 FC
YOR
York9 FC